Narva College of the University of Tartu is a college of the University of Tartu. It was founded in 1999 in the city of Narva, Estonia.

Organisation 
The head of the College is a director, who is appointed by the Council of the University of Tartu. The College comprises five divisions: Division of Civic Studies, Division of Psychology and Pedagogy, Division of Estonian Language and Literature, Division of Russian Language and Literature, and Division of Foreign Languages.

Teaching and Degrees

Full-time studies

Open University

Re-training and in-service courses

Research and conferences

Projects

College building

References

External links 
 Narva College of the University of Tartu
 University of Tartu
 City of Narva

Narva College
Universities and colleges in Estonia
Narva
Educational institutions established in 1999
1999 establishments in Estonia
Buildings and structures in Ida-Viru County